Nina Anisimova may refer to:

Nina Anisimova (dancer) (1909–1979), Russian dancer and choreographer 
Nina Anisimova (triathlete) (born 1973), Russian Olympic triathlete